Carnetin is a commune in the Seine-et-Marne department in the Île-de-France region in north-central France.

Demographics
The inhabitants are called Carnetinois.

See also
Communes of the Seine-et-Marne department

References

External links

1999 Land Use, from IAURIF (Institute for Urban Planning and Development of the Paris-Île-de-France région) 

Communes of Seine-et-Marne